Andy Linden is an actor from England. He is best known for his roles as Mundungus Fletcher in Harry Potter and the Deathly Hallows – Part 1 and John the Watch in Count Arthur Strong.

Selected filmography

Film

Television

References

External links
 

Living people
Year of birth missing (living people)
English male film actors
English male television actors
20th-century English male actors
21st-century English male actors